Captain Clegg may refer to:

 Captain Clegg a character in the Doctor Syn stories
 Captain Clegg (film), a 1962 film by Hammer Films
 Captain Clegg & The Night Creatures, a psychobilly band featured in the 2009 film Halloween II